Prorsococcus is a genus of mealybug native to Australia. The genus only contains the single species Prorsococcus acanthodus, described by Williams in 1985. Prorsococcus acanthodus is regularly attended by the ant Ochetellus flavipes, where they will build them shelters from predators.

References

External links
 Prorsococcus acanthodus in the Atlas of Living Australia

Hemiptera of Australia
Insects of Australia
Monotypic Hemiptera genera
Sternorrhyncha genera
Pseudococcidae